The 2012 Men's Pan American Junior Championship was the tenth edition of the men's Pan American Junior Championship. The tournament was held between 10 and 23 September 2012 at the Pan American Hockey Stadium in Guadalajara, Mexico.

The tournament served as a qualifier for the 2013 Junior World Cup, held in New Delhi, India in December 2013.

Argentina won the tournament for the 10th time, defeating Canada 3–2 in the final. Chile won the bronze medal by defeating the United States 3–2 in the third and fourth place playoff.

Participating nations
A total of thirteen teams competed in the tournament:

 (defending champions)

Results

Preliminary round

Pool A

Pool B

Pool C

Medal round

Pool D

Pool E

Non-medal round

Pool F

Pool G

Classification matches

Eleventh and twelfth place

Ninth and tenth place

Seventh and eighth place

Fifth and sixth place

Third and fourth place

Final

Final standings

 Qualified for the 2013 Junior World Cup

References

Pan American Junior Championship
Sport in Guadalajara, Jalisco
21st century in Guadalajara, Jalisco
Pan American Junior Championship
International field hockey competitions hosted by Mexico
Pan American Junior Championship
Pan American Junior Championship
Pan American Championship